Raymond Bruce Hopkins (born 25 November 1955) is a New Zealand actor, most famous for his portrayal of Gamling in The Lord of the Rings film trilogy by Peter Jackson and for playing the voice of evil alien Choobo on Power Rangers Ninja Storm. He also founded ActionActors, an actor-specific temporary employment agency, with Bruce Hurst.

Hopkins was born in Invercargill, the son of Colleen Marguerite and Bill Hopkins, a crayfisherman. He was a crayfisherman and a PE teacher before dedicating himself to the performing arts. He has worked as a professional dancer, theater company actor, television and film actor, voice actor, and radio host.

Filmography

Film

Television

References

External links
Short Bio
ABC Radio National interview, 2018 

1955 births
Living people
New Zealand male film actors
New Zealand male soap opera actors
New Zealand male television actors
New Zealand male voice actors
New Zealand people of Welsh descent
People from Invercargill
20th-century New Zealand male actors
21st-century New Zealand male actors